Garrett Festerling (born March 3, 1986) is a professional ice hockey forward who is under contract with the Straubing Tigers of the Deutsche Eishockey Liga (DEL). He is a dual citizen of Canada and Germany.

Playing career 
Festerling played for the Vernon Vipers of the BCHL before making the move to the WHL. He first represented the Portland Winter Hawks and then joined the Regina Pats.

In 2007, Festerling headed over the pond to play professionally in Germany and spent the 2007-08 season with EV Füssen, a team from the third division in Germany. Festerling excelled as the league's leading scorer, recording 50 goals and 70 assists in 45 games, while being named Oberliga Player of the Year by eishockeynews.de.

His outstanding performances with the Füssen team drew the attention of teams from the German elite league Deutsche Eishockey Liga (DEL). Festerling eventually signed with the Hannover Scorpions in 2008, joining the DEL side on a three-year contract. In his second year in Hannover, Festerling saw action in 18 contests en route to winning the German championship with the Scorpions.

He left the team after the championship season to pursue more playing time and joined the Hamburg Freezers for the 2010–11 campaign. Festerling developed into a key member of the Freezers’ squad and was joined by his twin brother Brett who signed with the Freezers in April 2014. Garrett inked a four-year contract extension with the Freezers in June 2014. The Freezers folded in May 2016, which made Festerling a free agent. Only a couple of days later, he was picked up by another DEL team, Adler Mannheim. He signed a three-year deal with the Adler organization.

During the final season of his contract with Adler in 2018–19, Festerling signed in advance for the 2019–20 season, agreeing to a two-year contract with rival club Grizzlys Wolfsburg on January 19, 2019. He proceeded to contribute offensively with Adler, enjoying his most productive season with the club with 33 points in 52 games and helping claim the DEL championship in the playoffs.

On May 5, 2022, Festerling was signed to a one-year contact in joining his fifth DEL club, Straubing Tigers, for the 2022–23 season.

International play
In December 2011, Festerling made his debut on the German Men's National Team in an exhibition game against Russia.

Personal life 
His twin brother Brett Festerling previously played in the Winnipeg Jets organization of the National Hockey League.

Festerling's grandfather emigrated from Hamburg, Germany, to Canada after World War 2.

Career statistics

Regular season and playoffs

International

Awards and honours

References

External links
 

1986 births
Living people
Adler Mannheim players
Canadian expatriate ice hockey players in Germany
Canadian expatriate ice hockey players in the United States
EV Füssen players
Grizzlys Wolfsburg players
Hamburg Freezers players
Hannover Scorpions players
Oklahoma City Blazers (1992–2009) players
Portland Winterhawks players
Regina Pats players
Sportspeople from Prince George, British Columbia
Straubing Tigers players
Canadian twins
Twin sportspeople
Vernon Vipers players